The Borger Gassers were a minor league baseball team that operated in the West Texas–New Mexico League 1937 through 1954 with a break from 1943 to 1945 due to World War II. Borger Gassers disbanded on July 16, 1954.

Players

Pitchers 
William Hair, 1947
Robert Garrett, 1953
Eddie Carnett, 1948–1952, 1948; batted .409 with 33 home runs and 161 RBIs; other years he batted over .300; from the mound 13-6 in 1950 and 10-6 in 1952
Howard Parks, 1939
Robert Fulton Crues (Bob Crues), 1940
Claude Gerald "Lefty" Blair (dates unknown)

Infielders 
Verdun Gilchrist, 1946-1950; shortstop, second baseman
Littleton Pierson Henry (Ish), 1946, catcher 
Tommy Fox, 1946-1954; 3rd base; hit 4 home runs off of Bobby Lane, one of which went into the Huber swimming pool
Luis Sanchez, 1951, shortstop

Outfielders 
Gordon Nell, .389-40-175 season in 1940; led the league in home runs and drove in over 160 runs five times

Unknown position 
Jim Cain
Pat Lorenzo
Leon Cato
Frank Warren
Stewart Williams
Udell Moore
William Scopetone
Joseph Kilkuskie

Owners
Abe Latman
Dr. Melvin C Kimball

Managers 
F.K. Withers, 1939
Pete Susko / Gordon Neil, 1940
Gordon Nell, 1941
Hugh Willingham, 1942
Ted Clawitter, 1946
Gordon Nell / Stu Williams, 1947
Eddie Carnett, 1948
Eddie Carnett / Kenneth Sears, 1949
Mickey Burnett, 1950
Eddie Carnett /Lloyd Brown, 1951
Lloyd Brown, 1952 
Lloyd Brown / Herschel Martin, 1953
Herschel Martin / Tommy Warren, 1954

References 

 Gary Bedingfield's Baseball in Wartime!
Society for American Baseball Research publications: Minor League Baseball Stars, Volume I (1978) and Volume II (1985).
http://www.hardballtimes.com/main/article/the-west-texas-new-mexico-league/
The Encyclopedia of Minor League Baseball: Second Edition

External links 
http://bioproj.sabr.org/bioproj.cfm?a=v&v=l&bid=647&pid=16946
https://www.webcitation.org/query?url=http://www.geocities.com/big_bunko/westtexasnewmexico3742.htm&date=2009-10-25+13:34:39

Borger, Texas
Defunct minor league baseball teams
Baseball teams established in 1939
Baseball teams disestablished in 1954
Defunct baseball teams in Texas
1939 establishments in Texas
1954 disestablishments in Texas